Saglemi housing project (also known as the Saglemi Affordable Housing Project) is a public housing project located in Prampram in the Ningo Prampram District in the Greater Accra Region of Ghana. The Ghana Home Loans Company were to provide mortgage arrangements for the housing units to be sold to employees.

History 
The project was begun in 2012 by the National Democratic Congress to ease the accommodation deficit in Ghana. The project was funded by Credit Suisse following a Parliament of Ghana approval, was granted on 13 October 2012. On 4 January 2013, the Ministry of Finance who was the borrower and the lender signed a facility agreement for the release of $200 million to fund the construction of the 5,000 housing units, Collins Dauda who was the then Minister for Water Resources, Works and Housing signed the Engineering Procurement and Construction Agreement with Construtora OAS Ghana Limited, represented by Clocanas.

Construction 
The facility sits on a 300-acre land and was meant to be a 5,000-residential unit building. It has one to three-bedroom flats for persons who earn low income. The agreement signed between the Government stated it would be done in four phases.

 Phase One saw the building of 180 blocks comprising over 1,500 flats

Controversy 
The project became a matter of controversy after the New Patriotic Party took power after years of abandonment. Samuel Atta Akyea said the agreement was botched following acts of embezzlement by former NDC government officials. Out of the 5,000 proposed housing units, only 668 housing units were completed. The Attorney General claimed the completed houses were not habitable and also added that the project at the site worth $64million even though it was stated about $196million was spent. Collins Dauda, Agyeman-Mensah; the Chief Director at the ministry from 2009 to 2017, Alhaji Ziblim Yakubu; the Executive Chairman of Construtora OAS, the Brazilian company which constructed the affordable housing project at Saglemi, Andrew Clocanas, and a director of RMS, the Engineering, Procurement and Construction (EPC) consultancy subcontractor, Nouvi Tetteh Angelo faced 52 counts of criminal charges and were accused for willfully causing financial loss to the state.

Continuation 
Francis Asenso-Boakye claimed the project would be completed after the ministry tasked the Ghana Institution of Surveyors to conduct a cost and technical audit of the agreement.

References 

Public housing
Government of Ghana